Steven Dante (stage name of Steven Barrington Dennis) is a British soul singer and songwriter, who had several singles released in the 1980s on the Cooltempo label. His only solo album, Find Out, was released on Chrysalis in 1988.  It peaked at #87 in the UK Albums Chart in September 1988. He has also collaborated with several house producers, providing vocals for John "Jellybean" Benitez, D Mob and Lighthouse Family. "The Real Thing", released in 1987 with Jellybean, reached #13 on the UK Singles Chart, and was a US Billboard Hot Dance Club Play chart number-one single. It was included on Jellybean's album Just Visiting This Planet.

Dante also wrote songs for Total Contrast and By All Means, and sang backing vocals for Shara Nelson.

Discography

Albums

Singles

References

External links
 

20th-century Black British male singers
British soul singers
Year of birth missing (living people)
Living people
Place of birth missing (living people)
British male songwriters